The Macmerry Branch was a North British Railway built double track branch railway line in East Lothian, Scotland, that ran from a junction west of  on the East Coast Main Line to  via four intermediate stations, Ormiston, and Winton.

History
Authorised on 3 June 1862 the line was completed and opened on 19 March 1870. Opened to serve local collieries and the Gladsmuir iron works, it was not until 1 May 1872 that the line's stations opened. The spur line to Hardengreen Junction closed in 1913 and the line itself closed in stages. For passengers, the Macmerry to Ormiston closed on 1 July 1925,  closed on 22 September 1930, and the remaining line  to Smeaton Jn on 3 April 1933. For freight the section Macmerry to Ormiston closed on 2 May 1960, and the rest of the line on 25 May 1965. The small section that remained open to serve Dalkeith colliery and its washery closed in 1980.

The stretch from Crossgatehall to Saltoun now forms the Pencaitland Railway Walk.

Connections with other lines
 Gifford and Garvald Railway at Ormiston
 North British Railway Main Line at 

See also
The Smeaton railway branches of the Lothians

References

Bibliography

External links
 The line on RailScot
 Map of route

Closed railway lines in Scotland
North British Railway
Pre-grouping British railway companies
Railway lines opened in 1870
Railway lines closed in 1980